The Abu Dhabi World Professional Jiu-Jitsu Championship (ADWPJJC), often simply called the Abu Dhabi World Pro, and from 2009 to 2014 known as the World Professional Jiu-Jitsu Cup (WPJJC), is an international Brazilian Jiu-Jitsu competition that takes place every year in Abu Dhabi, United Arab Emirates. The tournament is organised by the UAE Jiu-Jitsu Federation (UAEJJF) since 2012, attracting competitors from 60 countries across all belt levels.

History 
The first Abu Dhabi World Professional Jiu-Jitsu Championship was established in 2009 as the World Professional Jiu-Jitsu Cup. In 2022 it is considered the main event of the Abu Dhabi Jiu Jitsu Pro (AJP), a tournament circuit with over 80 events in all six continents, that also include the Abu Dhabi Grand Slam Jiu-Jitsu World Tour.

Supported personally by his Highness the Supreme Prince and Commander In Chief of the United Arab Emirates National Army, H. H. Sheik Mohamed Bin Zayed Al Nahyan, the inaugural 2009 tournament had the prize purse of US$111,000. This amount was increased further to US$150,000 in 2010  and is planned to increase to US$272,000 (AED 1,000,000) in 2011, which are the largest money prizes in history of Brazilian Jiu-Jitsu tournaments. In 2019 the World Pro attracted more than 5,000 competitors for a prize pot of $600,000.

Participation in the trials is not mandatory; however the winners of the trials have an all expenses (airfare, hotel, meals) paid trip to Abu Dhabi for the tournament.

Gold medalists

Male black belt medalists

2009–2011

2012–2014

2015

2016

2017–2019

Female brown / black belt medalists

See also 
 Abu Dhabi Grand Slam Jiu-Jitsu World Tour
 UAEJJF weight classes

References 

Brazilian jiu-jitsu competitions
Sport in Abu Dhabi
World Jiu-Jitsu Championship